ICMP  may refer to:

Science and technology
 International Collection of Microorganisms from Plants, a culture collection in New Zealand
 International Congress on Mathematical Physics
 Internet Control Message Protocol, used in computer networking
 Ischemic cardiomyopathy, a type of heart disease

Other uses
 The Institute of Contemporary Music Performance, in London, UK
 International Commission on Missing Persons, an intergovernmental organization